Throughout 2009, 130 tropical cyclones formed in bodies of water known as tropical cyclone basins. The strongest storm of the year was Typhoon Nida in the Western Pacific Ocean. The deadliest and costliest storm of the year was Typhoon Morakot (Kiko) causing 789 fatalities through its track in the Philippines, Japan, Taiwan, China, and the Korean peninsula. Throughout the year, twenty-one Category 3 tropical cyclones formed, including five Category 5 tropical cyclones in the year.

Tropical cyclones are primarily monitored by a group of ten warning centres, which have been designated as a Regional Specialized Meteorological Center (RSMC) or a Tropical Cyclone Warning Center (TCWC) by the World Meteorological Organization. These are the United States National Hurricane Center (NHC) and Central Pacific Hurricane Center, the Japan Meteorological Agency (JMA), the India Meteorological Department (IMD), Météo-France, Indonesia's Badan Meteorologi, Klimatologi, dan Geofisika, the Australian Bureau of Meteorology (BOM), Papua New Guinea's National Weather Service, the Fiji Meteorological Service (FMS) as well as New Zealand's MetService. Other notable warning centres include the Philippine Atmospheric, Geophysical and Astronomical Services Administration (PAGASA), the United States Joint Typhoon Warning Center (JTWC), and the Brazilian Navy Hydrographic Center.

Global atmospheric and hydrological conditions 
The 2009–10 El Niño event started in the Pacific Ocean during May 2009, and it would peak in December of the year.

Summary

North Atlantic Ocean 

The North Atlantic featured a below-average event in tropical cyclone formation that produced only 11 tropical cyclones, 9 named storms, 3 hurricanes, and 2 major hurricanes. Like a typical Atlantic hurricane season, it officially began on Monday, June 1, 2009, and ended on Monday, November 30, 2009. These dates conventionally delimit the period of each year when most tropical cyclones develop in the Atlantic basin. Activity began slightly early when Tropical Depression One developed on May 28, marking the third and last consecutive season with a pre-season storm. The final storm, Hurricane Ida, dissipated on November 10. Hurricane Bill, the first hurricane, major hurricane, and most intense hurricane was a powerful Cape Verde-type hurricane that affected areas from the Leeward Islands to Newfoundland. With only 11 tropical depressions and 9 named storms, the 2009 season featured the lowest number of tropical cyclones since the 1997 season, and only one system, Claudette, made landfall in the United States. Forming from the interaction of a tropical wave and an upper-level low, Claudette made landfall on the Florida Panhandle with maximum sustained winds of  before quickly dissipating over Alabama. The storm killed two people and caused $228,000 (2009 USD) in damage. Overall, the season's activity was reflected with a very low cumulative accumulated cyclone energy (ACE) rating of only 53, the lowest since 1997. Because of the low number of storms in the 2009 season, many of which were weak, short-lived, and/or very disorganized, the overall ACE value was ranked as below-average, totaling under 66. Being the most intense hurricane, Hurricane Bill was responsible for the ACE value for August being 30% above average. ACE is, broadly speaking, a measure of the power of the hurricane multiplied by the length of time it existed, so storms that last a long time, as well as particularly strong hurricanes, have high ACEs. ACE is only calculated for full advisories on tropical systems at or exceeding  or tropical storm strength. Subtropical cyclones are excluded from the total.

Eastern & Central Pacific Oceans 

The Eastern and Central Pacific featured their most active Pacific hurricane season since 1994. The season officially started on Friday, May 15, 2009, in the East Pacific Ocean, and on Monday, June 1, 2009, in the Central Pacific; they both ended on Monday, November 30, 2009. These dates conventionally delimit the period of each year when most tropical cyclones form in the Eastern and Central Pacific basins. However, the formation of tropical cyclones is possible at any time of the year. There were no off-season storms, as the season began relatively late, and ended very early. The accumulated cyclone energy (ACE) index for the 2009 Pacific hurricane season was 117.09 units in the Eastern Pacific and 9.905 units in the Central Pacific. The total ACE in the basin combined is 126.995 units. Broadly speaking, ACE is a measure of the power of a tropical or subtropical storm multiplied by the length of time it existed. The season, however, was characterized as "near-normal", featuring 17 named storms 8 hurricanes and 5 major hurricanes. The central Pacific experienced above-average activity with three additional storms forming west of 140°W and three more crossing over from the eastern Pacific. The overall number of storms led to a relative lull in activity experienced over the previous decade. During the course of the year, large-scale factors such as an El Niño and two Madden–Julian oscillations greatly contributed to the changed pattern. The season's activity, east of 140°W, was reflected with a near-average cumulative accumulated cyclone energy (ACE) rating of 100, roughly 94% of the 30-year median. ACE, again, is, broadly speaking, a measure of the power of the hurricane multiplied by the length of time it existed, so storms that last a long time, as well as particularly strong hurricanes, have high ACEs. ACE is only calculated for full advisories on tropical systems at or exceeding  or tropical storm strength.

Western Pacific Ocean 

The Western Pacific featured a below average event that spawned only 22 named storms, 13 typhoons, and five super typhoons. It was also recognized as the deadliest season in the Philippines for decades. The first half of the season was very quiet whereas the second half of the season was extremely active. The season's first named storm, Kujira, developed on May 3 while the season's last named storm, Nida, dissipated on December 3. Nida was the most intense of the whole year worldwide.

North Indian Ocean 

The North Indian Ocean featured a generally below average event in the annual cycle of tropical cyclone formation. It featured 8 depressions, 6 deep depressions, 4 cyclonic storms, and 1 severe cyclonic storm. No classifications higher. The North Indian Ocean cyclone season has no official bounds, but cyclones tend to form between April and December, with peaks in May and November. These dates conventionally delimit the period of each year when most tropical cyclones form in the northern Indian Ocean.

Systems 
There have been 128 tropical disturbances that have formed in 2009, marking an above-average year in tropical cyclone formation throughout the world. One was believed to have formed in the South Atlantic Ocean in late January, and was unofficially added in the 2009 advisories. 82 further intensified to tropical storms, and each received named from each tropical cyclone agency.

January 
During January 2009, a total of 14 tropical cyclones formed, while 8 were named. The Cyclone Fanele was the most intense of the month, reaching category 4 on the SSHWS scale, with a barometric pressure of 930 mbar. The other storms were relatively weak, with a force equivalent to a tropical storm. A rare subtropical system was reported in the southern Atlantic, affecting the southern coasts of Brazil and Uruguay. No major damage or death was reported.

February 

February was moderately active

March 

March was moderately active

April 

April was relatively inactive,

May 

May was relatively inactive,

June 

June was relatively inactive with six tropical cyclones and three tropical storm-equivalent cyclones forming. Hurricane Andres gave the 2009 Pacific hurricane season a late start when it formed on June 21 (the latest start on record until the record was beaten exactly a decade later when Alvin formed on June 25, 2019).

July 

July was slightly inactive in terms of intensity per tropical cyclones, and slightly active in terms of number of tropical cyclones that formed, with nine. Seven were tropical storm equivalent, and only two were hurricane or typhoon equivalent tropical cyclones. No majors. Although Hurricane Carlos was the most intense of the month, none of the tropical cyclones caused any form of severe destruction. Over 50 people were killed, however, a deadly exception.

August 

Tropical Storm Ana became the first named storm of the very inactive 2009 Atlantic hurricane season, when it formed on August 11, one of that latest first named storms on record since Alex of 2004. Typhoon Morakot (Kiko) was the deadliest tropical cyclone of the year, killing 789 total. Hurricane Jimena became the most intense of the month in the latter portion of August.

September 

September was the second-most active of the year.

October 

October was inactive in terms of tropical cyclones, but it was slightly active in terms of intensity in hPa/mbar., especially towards the end of the month. 10 tropical cyclones formed in October 2009. 9 of those attained storm intensities and were named. Hurricane Rick was the third-most intense Pacific hurricane on record, as well as the second-most intense of 2009 worldwide. The 2009 Pacific hurricane season ended slightly earlier than usual when Hurricane Neki dissipated on October 27

November 
November was relatively inactive with only 10 tropical cyclones forming and 5 attaining tropical storm intensities. The inactive 2009 Atlantic hurricane season ended when Hurricane Ida dissipated on November 10 (it transitioned to a Nor'easter just after, so it ended when "Nor'Ida" dissipated) Despite two tropical disturbances forming in August and September, the 2009–10 South-West Indian Ocean cyclone season actually didn't see a named tropical storm form until November 13. The start to the season was pretty intense when Cyclone Anja peaked at 950 hPa. Typhoon Nida was the most intense of the year, peaking at a pressure of 905 hPa, just ahead of Hurricane Rick of the previous month.

December 
December was relatively and slightly inactive

Global effects

Notes 

1 Only systems that formed either on or after January 1, 2009 are counted in the seasonal totals.

2 Only systems that formed either before or on December 31, 2009 are counted in the seasonal totals.

3 The wind speeds for this tropical cyclone/basin are based on the IMD Scale which uses 3-minute sustained winds.

4 The wind speeds for this tropical cyclone/basin are based on the Saffir Simpson Scale which uses 1-minute sustained winds.

5The wind speeds for this tropical cyclone are based on Météo-France which uses gust winds.

See also 

 Tropical cyclones by year
 List of earthquakes in 2009
 Tornadoes of 2009

References

External links 

Regional Specialized Meteorological Centers
 US National Hurricane Center – North Atlantic, Eastern Pacific
 Central Pacific Hurricane Center – Central Pacific
 Japan Meteorological Agency – NW Pacific
 India Meteorological Department – Bay of Bengal and the Arabian Sea
 Météo-France – La Reunion – South Indian Ocean from 30°E to 90°E
 Fiji Meteorological Service – South Pacific west of 160°E, north of 25° S

Tropical Cyclone Warning Centers
 Meteorology, Climatology, and Geophysical Agency of Indonesia – South Indian Ocean from 90°E to 141°E, generally north of 10°S
 Australian Bureau of Meteorology (TCWC's Perth, Darwin & Brisbane) – South Indian Ocean & South Pacific Ocean from 90°E to 160°E, generally south of 10°S
 Papua New Guinea National Weather Service – South Pacific Ocean from 141°E to 160°E, generally north of 10°S
 Meteorological Service of New Zealand Limited – South Pacific west of 160°E, south of 25°S

Tropical cyclones by year
2009 Atlantic hurricane season
2009 Pacific hurricane season
2009 Pacific typhoon season
2009 North Indian Ocean cyclone season
2008–09 Australian region cyclone season
2009–10 Australian region cyclone season
2008–09 South Pacific cyclone season
2009–10 South Pacific cyclone season
2008–09 South-West Indian Ocean cyclone season
2009–10 South-West Indian Ocean cyclone season
2009-related lists